A steak is a cut of meat, by default beef, sliced perpendicular to the grain, and some other foods.

Steak may also refer to:
 Steak (film), a 2007 film by Quentin Dupieux
 Steak (album), the soundtrack album to the film
 Mr. Steak, a restaurant chain
 "Steak" (Maalaala Mo Kaya), a 2019 episode about Bong Go

See also 
 Stake (disambiguation)
 Beefsteak (disambiguation)